Kaalai is a 2008 Indian Tamil-language action film directed by Tharun Gopi. The lead roles are played by Silambarasan and Vedhika. Supporting roles are played by Sangeetha, Seema, Santhanam, 
Lal and Sulile Kumar. The film's score and soundtrack were composed by G. V. Prakash Kumar. The film opened on 14 January 2008 to mixed reviews and was a commercial failure. The Hindi dubbed version was named, Jwalamukhi (Man With Fire).

Plot
Jeeva shares his name with two other people: one villain and one police officer Jeevanandham who becomes a villain. The confusion arising from this is a significant part of the plot.

At the age of nine, Jeeva’s grandmother Karuppayi Aatha slays five men because they scorned her father’s advice and illegally distilled alcohol in the village. After her return from prison, the villagers both fear and revere her, and consider her the head of the village.

Jeevanandham comes to the village ruled by Karuppayi Aatha to try to find illicit activity. When he cannot find anything, he is thrashed by the villagers. He returns to take vengeance, and in the course of the hostilities burns Karuppayi Aatha alive.

Jeeva the criminal is meanwhile wooing Jeevanandham’s daughter Brindha. But Brindha loves Jeeva, Karuppayi's grandson, and he wants to take revenge on his namesake for the death of his grandmother. He abducts Brindha as a hostage to lure her father to his death.

Cast

Silambarasan as Jeeva
Vedhika as Brindha
Sangeetha as Lakshmi
Seema as Karuppayi Aatha
Santhanam
Lal as Jeevanandham IPS
Sulile Kumar as Jeeva
Shanmugarajan as A.C.P Vallayan
Dhandapani
Sabarna as Brindha's friend
Nellai Siva as Police officer
Nila as dancer in "Guththa Lakkadi"
Rinson Simon as a background dancer in the song  "Kutti Pisaase" (uncredited)
Mahat Raghavendra as Jeeva's friend (uncredited)
Ramdoss as Tea shop fight participant (uncredited)

Production

Casting
In pre-production work, Tarun Gopi originally offered the lead role to Madhavan, then to Telugu actor Prabhas. Neither was able to take up the role, so Silambarasan was recruited instead. The original choice for the lead female role was Trisha, who was replaced by Vedhika. Prakashraj was originally selected for the role of the police officer Jeeva, but he was replaced by Malayalam actor Lal.

Filming
Most of the film was shot in the villages around Theni. Australia was originally planned to be the location for filming songs, but due to visa problems these scenes were shifted to Malaysia. A fast beat song sequence was shot at the Golden Beach, Chennai with Simbu and Vedhika. For much of the filming the heroine was not finalized, so large sections of the movie were shot without the female lead. The shoots appeared disorganized, with few actors recruited ahead of time. Silambarasan did some editing work with Anthony, who is said to have been impressed by his work and presented him with 25,000 rands.

Soundtrack

The soundtrack consists of six songs composed by G. V. Prakash Kumar. Actress Mamta Mohandas sang the song Kaala Kaala. The soundtrack had a soft launch.

Release
The rights for satellite broadcast were sold to Sun TV. The film was given an "A" certificate by the Indian Censor Board. The film was released at the Pongal 2008 festival at the same time as Bheemaa, Pidichirukku, Pirivom Santhippom, Pazhani and Vaazhthugal.

Critical reception
Indiaglitz wrote: "The narrative is too loud and it lacks finesse. Silambarasan handles the 'omnipotent hero' character with confidence. Vedhika announces her arrival as the potential glam girl of 2008. This one with a beautiful and innocent face has just the right figure to take up glamour roles".

Nowrunning wrote: "Silambarasan's more than life image is unrealistic if not out of place. Vedhika exudes glamour and performs well in duet songs".

Sify wrote: "When Silambarasan and director Tarun Gopi came together in Kaalai we expected a racy masala entertainer. Sadly it is a watered down version of earlier films and ends up as an over-the-top ham enterprise, Kaalai is like a bull in a china shop and makes you groan".

References 

2008 action films
2000s Tamil-language films
2008 films
Indian films about revenge
Films set in Tamil Nadu
Films shot in Malaysia
Films shot in Tamil Nadu
Indian action films
2000s masala films
Films scored by G. V. Prakash Kumar
Films shot in Australia